U.S. Highway 70 (US 70) runs east–west through across the heart of Arkansas for . US 70 enters the state from Oklahoma west of De Queen, and exits to Tennessee at Memphis, running concurrently with Interstate 55 (I-55), US 61, US 64, and US 79. The highway passes through the major cities of Hot Springs, Little Rock, North Little Rock, and West Memphis.

Between Oklahoma and Hot Springs National Park, US 70 is largely rural and two-lane. The route bypasses much of the city to the south and then serves as the arterial road between Hot Springs National Park and Little Rock. The highway runs concurrently with I-30 between a place north of Haskell to southwestern Little Rock, where it splits to traverse through downtown Little Rock and North Little Rock. Between North Little Rock and its merge into I-55 at West Memphis, the route is principally two-lane and has been supplanted by I-40, which always runs within a few miles of the highway.

Major intersections

References

External links

 Arkansas
Transportation in Sevier County, Arkansas
Transportation in Howard County, Arkansas
Transportation in Pike County, Arkansas
Transportation in Montgomery County, Arkansas
Transportation in Hot Spring County, Arkansas
Transportation in Garland County, Arkansas
Transportation in Saline County, Arkansas
Transportation in Pulaski County, Arkansas
Transportation in Lonoke County, Arkansas
Transportation in Prairie County, Arkansas
Transportation in Monroe County, Arkansas
Transportation in St. Francis County, Arkansas
Transportation in Crittenden County, Arkansas
70